The parsley frogs or Pelodytidae are a family of order Anura. The family consists of a single genus, Pelodytes, which contains five species. These frogs can be found in south-western Europe and the Caucasus. The common name of "parsley frogs" comes from the common parsley frog which, because of its colouring, appears to be garnished with parsley.

Parsley frogs are typical-looking frogs closely related to European spadefoot toads and megophryids, but differ largely in appearance. Their cryptic colouring is not as strong as in many megophryids, but they are still quite well-camouflaged, usually being green or brown. Unlike the European spadefoot toads, they lack hardened protrusions on their feet, although they are still fossorial, and are generally slender.

They are one of the few families of frogs which contain more known extinct species and genera (two or three) than extant species. Although now found only in the Palearctic realm, fossils of a mid-Miocene species were also found in North America.

Taxonomy
 Family Pelodytidae
 Genus Pelodytes
 Pelodytes atlanticus – Lusitanian parsley frog
 Pelodytes caucasicus – Caucasian parsley frog
 Pelodytes hespericus – Hesperides' parsley frog
 Pelodytes ibericus – Iberian parsley frog
 Pelodytes punctatus – Common parsley frog

References

 
Pelodytidae
Extant Lutetian first appearances
Taxa named by Charles Lucien Bonaparte
Palearctic fauna